Hristos Meletoglou (born January 2, 1972) is a Greek triple jumper.

He was born in Heinsberg, West Germany.

His personal best jump is 17.19 metres, achieved in June 2001 in Bremen. This ranks him fourth among Greek triple jumpers, only behind Dimitrios Tsiamis, Konstadinos Zalaggitis and  Stamatios Lenis.

International competitions

References

External links

1972 births
Living people
Greek male triple jumpers
Athletes (track and field) at the 2000 Summer Olympics
Athletes (track and field) at the 2004 Summer Olympics
Olympic athletes of Greece
World Athletics Championships athletes for Greece
Mediterranean Games gold medalists for Greece
Mediterranean Games silver medalists for Greece
Mediterranean Games medalists in athletics
Athletes (track and field) at the 1997 Mediterranean Games
Athletes (track and field) at the 2005 Mediterranean Games
People from Heinsberg
Sportspeople from Cologne (region)
21st-century Greek people